AFQ is a three-letter acronym that may refer to:

 Alba Servizi Aerotrasporti, ICAO code for the Alba, Piedmont, Italy airport
 American Financial Group, alternate NYSE symbol
 Afloqualone
 AFQ1, metabolite of aflatoxin
 AFQ-056 (Mavoglurant), experimental drug candidate

See also
 AF (disambiguation)
 FAQ